Adejoke Lasisi is a Nigerian fashion designer, and environmentalist known for her development of fashion products and designs using nylon and textile wastes. She is the founder and CEO of Planet 3R and Jokelinks Weaving School.

Early life and education 
Adejoke started weaving at 9 with her parents. She later attended  Obafemi Awolowo University lle-lfe, where she obtained a bachelor's degree in Economics. She also has a certificate in Entrepreneurial Management from Enterprise Development Center in Lagos Nigeria.

Awards and recognition 
In July 2020, Adejoke won the Micro Small and Medium Enterprises (MSMEs) of the Year Award, an event which was well attended by state governors and ministers. She was recognized and celebrated by President Muhammadu Buhari as a youth innovator at the maiden celebration of the National Youth Day on November 1, 2020.

She also won the Eleven Eleven Twelve Foundation's Africa Green Grant Award on November 14, 2020 at the second edition for her actions to improve the environment.

References 

Nigerian women fashion designers
Living people
1986 births